The Revenge of Pancho Villa (1930–36)—Spanish title La Venganza de Pancho Villa—is a compilation film made by the Padilla family in El Paso, Texas, USA, from dozens of fact-based and fictional films about the celebrated Mexican revolutionary Pancho Villa (1878–1923).

The films were stitched together with original bilingual title cards and dramatic re-enactments of Villa's assassination were added to the revised print. The Revenge of Pancho Villa provides stirring evidence of a vital Mexican American film presence during the 1910s-1930s.

In 2009, it was named to the National Film Registry by the Library of Congress for being “culturally, historically or aesthetically” significant.

References

External links
La vengenza de Pancho Villa  essay by Laura Isabel Serna, PhD on the National Film Registry website 

The Revenge of Pancho Villa essay by Daniel Eagan in America's Film Legacy, 2009-2010: A Viewer's Guide to the 50 Landmark Movies Added To The National Film Registry in 2009–10, Bloomsbury Publishing USA, 2011,  pages 48–51 

United States National Film Registry films
Documentary films about historical events
Films about Mexican Americans
Compilation films
American biographical films
Films set in the 19th century
Films set in the 1900s
Films set in the 1910s
Films set in the 1920s
1936 films
Films set in Mexico
American black-and-white films
Mexican black-and-white films
1930s documentary films
Mexican biographical films
1930s biographical films
Mexican documentary films
American documentary films
1936 documentary films
1930s American films